Ebba Grön is the title of the Swedish punk band Ebba Grön's third and last album, first released April 1982. The album was recorded and mixed at Silence Studio between January and February 1982. Track 2, "Uppgång & fall" recorded and mixed at Mistlur's Studio.

The album includes the popular song Die Mauer, which is about two lovers separated by the Berlin Wall.

Track listing

References

1982 albums
Ebba Grön albums